Aram Volodya Kocharyan (14 November 1958 – 24 August 2022) was an Armenian politician. A member of the Republic Party, he served as governor of Lori Province from 2006 to 2011.

Kocharyan died on 24 August 2022, at the age of 68.

References

1952 births
2022 deaths
Armenian politicians
Republican Party of Armenia politicians
Armenian State Pedagogical University alumni
People from Vanadzor